Australian Copyright Council (ACC) is an Australian non-profit organisation established in 1968 whose purpose is to promote understanding of copyright law in Australia.

Affiliates 
 the following organisations are affiliated with the Australian Copyright Council:
 Aboriginal Artist Agency Limited
 Australian Recording Industry Association
 Australian Society of Authors
 Australasian Music Publishers Association
 Australian Writers' Guild
 Australia New Zealand Screen Association
 Ausdance
 Australian Publishers Association
 Australian Screen Directors Authorship Collecting Society
 Australian Institute of Architects
 Australian Music Centre
 Australian Institute of Professional Photographers
 APRA AMCOS 
 Big Studio Movie Licence
 Copyright Agency Limited
 Media Entertainment & Arts Alliance
 National Association for the Visual Arts
 National Tertiary Education Industry Union
 Phonographic Performance Company of Australia
 Screen Producers Association of Australia
 Screenrights

References

External links 
 

1968 establishments in Australia
Organizations established in 1968
Trade associations based in Australia
Copyright law organizations
Australian copyright law